Roger Brian Ruzek (born December 17, 1960) is a former American football placekicker in the National Football League (NFL) for the Dallas Cowboys and the Philadelphia Eagles. He also was a member of the New Jersey Generals in the United States Football League. He played college football at Weber State University.

Early years
Ruzek attended El Camino High School, where he played football, soccer and baseball. 

He accepted a football scholarship Weber State University, where he became a four-year starter and received All-Big Sky honors in every season. As a senior, he set a school record and led the NCAA Division I-AA in field goal accuracy (16-19, 84.2%). 

His 46 career field goals, and 221 career extra points where NCAA Division I-AA records. He also set different school records: 4 field goals in a game, 30 consecutive extra points, which at the time were best in school history. He made a 51 field goal, which was the second longest in school history at the time.

Professional career

Cleveland Browns
Ruzek was signed as an undrafted free agent by the Cleveland Browns after the 1983 NFL Draft. On August 17, he was waived after he couldn't unseat the incumbent kicker Matt Bahr.

New Jersey Generals (USFL)
After being out of football for a year, he received a tryout invitation from the New Jersey Generals of the United States Football League, performing well enough to be named the starter kicker for the 1984 season. His first field goal was a 51-yarder. In 1986, the team folded along with the rest of the league.

In two seasons, he made 34 of 48 (70.8%) field goal attempts and 100 of 105 extra point attempts (95.2%) for 202 points.

Dallas Cowboys
In November 1986, the Dallas Cowboys gave him a tryout. In 1987 he was signed as a free agent, to compete for the kicker position after Rafael Septien was released. In training camp, he was the first Cowboys player to be cut on August 6, after struggling with a right ankle injury. On August 19, He was re-signed and eventually won the kicking competition.

He made 22 of 25 (88%) field goal attempts, ranking second in the NFL and breaking a franchise record. His 92 points tied for fourth in the league among kickers. Against the New York Giants he tied an NFL record with 4 field goals made in one quarter (the most ever made in a fourth quarter). Against the Los Angeles Rams, he set a franchise mark with 5 field goals made (tied by Eddie Murray in 1993). 

In 1989, he was replaced with Luis Zendejas in the first two games during his contract holdout. He struggled at the beginning of the season to regain his form, finishing with 12 of 22 (54.5%) field goal attempts. On November 7, he was released after missing 6 of 11 field goals and replaced with Zendejas.

Philadelphia Eagles
On November 22, 1989, Ruzek signed as a free agent with the Philadelphia Eagles to replace a struggling Steve DeLine. The next year, he made a 53-yard field goal, which at the time was the third-longest in franchise history.

In 1993, the team signed Matt Bahr after Ruzek strained his right hamstring, while making a game-winning 30-yard field goal with time running out against the Green Bay Packers. He was released two weeks later on September 24, when the team decided to replace him with Bahr. He was re-signed on December 14, after Bahr struggled missing 5 of his last 8 field goal attempts. He finished making 8 of 10 in field goals and 13 of 16 extra points, including a game winner against the San Francisco 49ers.

On March 24, 1994, he was released to make room for veteran kicker Eddie Murray.

San Francisco 49ers
In 1994, he was signed by the San Francisco 49ers. On July 28, he was cut after the team decided to keep rookie third round draft choice Doug Brien.

San Jose SaberCats (AFL)
Ruzek signed with the San Jose SaberCats of the Arena Football League in 1996, making 3 out of 8 field goals and 11 out of 12 extra points.

London Monarchs (WLAF)
In 1996, he played with the London Monarchs of the World League of American Football, making 8 of 11 field goals (72.7%).

Personal life
Ruzek was given the classic nickname "Who Framed Roger Ruzek" (after the movie Who Framed Roger Rabbit) by sportscaster Chris Berman. He was a teammate of Herschel Walker with three different teams (Generals, Cowboys and Eagles).

References

1960 births
Living people
People from South San Francisco, California
Players of American football from San Francisco
American football placekickers
Weber State Wildcats football players
New Jersey Generals players
Dallas Cowboys players
Philadelphia Eagles players
San Jose SaberCats players
London Monarchs players